Justin Muschamp is a New Zealand wheelchair rugby player and a member of the national team, the Wheel Blacks.

Justin was part of the wheel blacks team that competed in the 2000 Summer Paralympics where they won the bronze medal.

References

External links 
 
 

Paralympic wheelchair rugby players of New Zealand
Wheelchair rugby players at the 2000 Summer Paralympics
Paralympic bronze medalists for New Zealand
Living people
Medalists at the 2000 Summer Paralympics
Year of birth missing (living people)
Paralympic medalists in wheelchair rugby